The 2010 Mauritian League season saw Pamplemousses SC become champions for the second time in their history and US Beau-Bassin/Rose Hill were relegated that season.

League table

References

Mauritian Premier League seasons
Mauritius
Mauritius
1